Nanidovirineae is a suborder of viruses in the order Nidovirales, comprising two families.

Hosts
Ghost sharks and the halfbeak Hyporhamphus sajori serve as natural hosts for species in the suborder. Nanidovirineae where found infecting these fishes only in China. Nanidovirineae is distinguished from its sibling suborders mainly by this reliance on fish hosts, although Tobaniviridae also have some fish as natural hosts.

Taxonomy

Families
 Nanghoshaviridae
 Nanhypoviridae

Sibling suborders 

 Arnidovirineae
 Coronaviridae
 Mesnidovirineae  
 Monidovirineae
 Ronidovirineae
 Tornidovirineae

References 

Nidovirales
Virus suborders